Burrel (formerly, Burrell) is an unincorporated community in Fresno County, California.

Burrel is located midway between California State Route 99 and Interstate 5.

The place is named for Cuthbert Burrel, owner of a nearby ranch. In the 1850s and 1860s, nearby Elkhorn Station functioned as a stage stop. A post office was established at Burrel in 1912, but was eventually shut down, with mail now routed through nearby Riverdale.

Burrel's only school is Burrel Union Elementary, which is Kindergarten through 8th grades. Students in the district usually attend high school in Riverdale.

References

Populated places established in 1912
Unincorporated communities in California
Unincorporated communities in Fresno County, California
1912 establishments in California